DXXX-TV, Channel 5, is a commercial television station owned and operated by the Radio Philippines Network. Its studios are located at Fairland Building, Nunez Extension, Zamboanga City and transmitter is located at Adelfa Lane, Barangay Tugbungan, Zamboanga City.

Areas of coverage
Zamboanga del Norte 
Zamboanga City 
Dipolog
Zamboanga del Sur
Pagadian 
Isabela, Basilan
Jolo, Sulu

Programming

Past programs
Iglesia ni Cristo (1987–1999, 2005-2006)
Good News Time - Foursquare Gospel Church in Zamboanga (2004–2006)
Ang Dating Daan (2005–2006)
Jesus Miracle Crusade (1996–2006)
Arangkada Chavacano (2000–2004, 2013–2017)
NewsWatch Chavacano (2004–2012)
NewsWatch Zamboanga (1987–1999)

See also
List of Radio Philippines Network affiliate stations
CNN Philippines
 

Television stations in Zamboanga City
Radio Philippines Network stations
Television channels and stations established in 1978